Urko is a Spanish name. It may refer to:

Urko Arroyo Rivas, a Spanish footballer
Urko Rafael Pardo Goas, a naturalized Cypriot footballer
Urko Vera Mateos, a Spanish footballer
Cibernético (Octavio López Arreola), a Mexican professional wrestler with ring name Urko